Union Graduate College (UGC) was an American university in Schenectady, New York from 1905 until it merged into Clarkson University in 2016. It was a part of Union College from 1905-2003, then part of Union University from 2003-2016.

History
The history of Union Graduate College begins in the early 20th century. Advanced degree study was being conducted on the Union College Campus in several disciplines. The master's degree in electrical engineering was available as early as 1905 and was the first graduate degree awarded by Union to a woman, when Florence Buckland received her a master's degree in electrical engineering in 1925.

The Union Graduate College School of Management began in the economics department of Union College. In May 1961, the Union Board of Trustees approved a master's program in industrial administration. The first three degrees in industrial administration were awarded in 1964.

Although advanced degrees in education had been available at Union earlier in the 1900s, a team of academic and administrative faculty was formed in 1986 to investigate the possibility of creating an innovative, high-quality teacher education program. They developed Union Graduate College's Master of Arts in Teaching (MAT) program in discipline areas that dove-tailed with the College's academic strengths: biology, chemistry, earth science (geology), French, German, Greek, Latin, mathematics, physics, social studies, and Spanish. The first class of 15 MAT students graduated in 1990.

Union College continued to expand its graduate degree study offerings with new master's programs in management, healthcare management, engineering, education and bioethics, developing innovative programs through strategic relationships with other highly respected Upstate New York education institutions such as Albany Law School, Albany College of Pharmacy and Albany Medical College. Union College established what was then known as the “Center for Graduate Education and Special Programs” to administer these advanced degree programs.

In the new millennium, bolstered by expanding enrollments in all graduate programs and the growing regional demand for full-time and part-time graduate study, Union recognized the need to create a new, independent, professional graduate college. The Graduate College of Union University was formed and chartered by the State Board of Regents as an independent college in July 2003. The school's name was changed to Union Graduate College in May 2006, a name that better reflected its Union College heritage.

On Feb. 1, 2016, Union Graduate College merged into Clarkson University and became the Clarkson University Capital Region Campus in Schenectady, N.Y., which serves as a recruiting hub for graduate and professional degree program admissions at all of the institution's operations in New York State and online.

The merger was approved in 2015 by the New York State Education Department Board of Regents and the Middle States Commission on Higher Education, which provides accreditation for Clarkson. The merger is unique in higher education, as both schools were in a sound fiscal position, both meeting and exceeding current enrollment targets, and both in good standing with their accrediting agencies.

Clarkson's graduate student recruitment and admissions for master's programs were based at the Capital Region Campus, which today supports a growing list of graduate education opportunities throughout the state, including Clarkson's Beacon Institute for Rivers & Estuaries in Beacon, N.Y., and a partnership with the Trudeau Institute in Saranac Lake, N.Y.

Union Graduate College merged into Clarkson University on February 1, 2016, becoming the "Clarkson University Capital Region Campus," which serves as a recruiting hub for graduate and professional degree program admissions at all of the institution's operations in New York State and online.

Schools
 School of Management
 School of Education
 School of Engineering
 Institute for a Sustainable Environment
The Bioethics Program

References 

Defunct private universities and colleges in New York (state)
Schenectady, New York
Clarkson University
2016 disestablishments in New York (state)
1905 establishments in New York (state)